Edward A. Gibbons (born March 1, 1949) is a Canadian politician. He is a former municipal councilor of Edmonton and Member of the Legislative Assembly of Alberta.

Gibbons won election to the Legislature from Edmonton Manning in the 1997 Alberta general election, holding the riding for the Alberta Liberal Party. While in the Legislature, he served as Liberal opposition critic for Municipal Affairs, Gaming, and Government Affairs. In the 2001 provincial election, the runner-up from the previous election, Progressive Conservative Tony Vandermeer, defeated Gibbons.

In 2001, Gibbons won election to Edmonton's city council from Ward 3. He was re-elected in 2004, 2007, 2010, and 2013.

References

External links
Ed Gibbons on Twitter

1949 births
Living people
Alberta Liberal Party MLAs
Edmonton city councillors
People from Sturgeon County
Northern Alberta Institute of Technology alumni